National Workers Party was a Pakistani political party. On 1 May 1999, the Awami Jamhoori Party, Pakistan Socialist Party and a faction of Pakistan National Party (led by Baloch leader Ghaus Bakhsh Bizenjo) formed the National Workers Party (NWP). Abid Hassan Minto was elected its first President and holds the office to date by election.

The NWP was part of the All Parties Democratic Movement (APDM) and the Awami Jamhoori Tehreek (AJT). Together with the Communist Mazdoor Kissan Party (CMKP) led by Sufi Abdul Khaliq, it was one of the two major communist political formations/parties in Pakistan in its time.

In In February 2010, the party merged with the Communist Mazdoor Kissan Party, People's Rights Movement (PRM) and other left wing parties to form Workers Party Pakistan which later merged with Awami Party Pakistan and Labour Party Pakistan to form Awami Workers Party.

External links 

 Awami Jamhooriat 2017, first socialist Urdu paper of Pakistan

References

Communist parties in Pakistan